Hammond, California may refer to:

Hammond, Fresno County, California
Hammond, Tulare County, California